Hagan Beggs (March 19, 1937 – September 16, 2016) was a Northern Irish-born Canadian actor. He was best known for starring as Dr. George Dunbar on the Canadian television series, Danger Bay, which aired on CBC Television and The Disney Channel from 1984 to 1990. Beggs also co-starred as Liam Gleeson on the Canadian series, Bordertown, from 1989 to 1991. His other television roles included a recurring role as Lt. Hansen during season one of Star Trek: The Original Series from 1966 to 1967.

Beggs was born in Belfast, Northern Ireland, on March 19, 1937. He immigrated to Canada as a young adult, where he worked as a film, radio, theater, and television actor, as well as a set decorator and props coordinator early in his career.

Beggs died in Vancouver, British Columbia, on September 16, 2016, at the age of 79.

Filmography

References

External links

1937 births
2016 deaths
Canadian male television actors
Canadian male film actors
Canadian male stage actors
Canadian male radio actors
Male actors from Belfast
Male actors from Vancouver
Northern Ireland emigrants to Canada